The Hector class was a type of 74-gun ship of the line designed for the French Navy in the 1750s. 

 
74-gun ship of the line classes
Ship of the line classes from France
Ship classes of the French Navy